Rene Michael Tosoni (born July 2, 1986) is a Canadian former professional baseball outfielder. He played in Major League Baseball (MLB) for the Minnesota Twins in 2011 and has also played in International competitions with the Canada national baseball team. He bats left-handed, yet plays his position right-handed.

Amateur career
Tosoni played youth baseball for the Coquitlam Reds of the B.C. Premier Baseball League.  Although he was selected by the Twins in the 34th-round of the 2004 Major League Baseball draft, he did not sign and was subsequently reselected by the Twins in the 36th-round of the 2005 Major League Baseball draft.

Professional career

2008: Fort Myers Miracle
Although Tosoni had a brief stint with the Gulf Coast League Twins to begin the year, he spent the majority of the  season assigned to the Twins' advanced A affiliate, the Fort Myers Miracle. With the Miracle, he batted .325 with one home run and 17 RBIs in the first half of the 2008 season—helping his team capture the Florida State League first-half West Division title. Along with teammates Robert Delaney, Brian Dinkelman, Jeff Manship, Wilson Ramos, Anthony Slama and Danny Valencia, Tosoni was selected to represent Fort Myers in the 2008 Florida State League All-Star game, however, a broken leg prevented him from attending. He was assigned to the Miracle's seven-day disabled list, and did not play from May 16 until August 26. For the season, his average fell to an even .300 upon his short return from the disabled list at the end of the season, however, his two-run home run in the first inning was the deciding factor in the Miracle's 2–1 victory over the Dunedin Blue Jays in game one of the 2008 division playoffs.

2009: New Britain Rock Cats
To begin the  season, Tosoni was assigned to the Twins' double A affiliate, the New Britain Rock Cats.  He was elected to participate for the World Team at the All-Star Futures Game at Busch Stadium in St. Louis, the host location of the MLB All-Star Game.  He appeared as a pinch hitter during the seventh inning and hit a go-ahead double off of Pittsburgh Pirates prospect Brad Lincoln.  His performance earned him the game's MVP honours.

2011: Minnesota Twins
Tosoni was called up by the Minnesota Twins on April 28, 2011.
Tosoni had a single in his first Major League appearance off of Tampa Bay Rays starter Jeremy Hellickson.
He recorded his first RBI in the same game while going 2 for 4 with two singles.
On September 27, Tosoni hit his first grand slam in a 7–4 Victory over the Kansas City Royals.

2013: Milwaukee Brewers
He signed a minor league contract with the Milwaukee Brewers prior to the 2013 season.

2014: Sioux City Explorers
Tosoni signed a contract with the Sioux City Explorers of the American Association for the 2014 season.

2016: Sugar Land Skeeters
Tosoni was traded from the Sioux City Explorers to the Sugar Land Skeeters of the Atlantic League of Professional Baseball. He became a free agent after the 2016 season.

Post playing days
Tosoni was named as the hitting coach for the A advanced Florida Fire Frogs in the Atlanta Braves organization for the 2018 season.

International play
Tosoni selected for the Canada national baseball team at the 2009 Baseball World Cup, 2013 World Baseball Classic, 2015 Pan American Games, 2015 WBSC Premier12, 2019 Pan American Games and 2019 WBSC Premier12.

References

External links

1986 births
Living people
Baseball players from Toronto
Baseball players at the 2015 Pan American Games
Baseball players at the 2019 Pan American Games
Beloit Snappers players
Canadian baseball coaches
Canadian expatriate baseball players in the United States
Cardenales de Lara players
Canadian expatriate baseball players in Venezuela
Chipola Indians baseball players
Elizabethton Twins players
Fort Myers Miracle players
Gulf Coast Twins players
Huntsville Stars players
Major League Baseball outfielders
Major League Baseball players from Canada
Minnesota Twins players
Minor league baseball coaches
Mesa Solar Sox players
New Britain Rock Cats players
Pan American Games gold medalists for Canada
Pan American Games medalists in baseball
Pan American Games silver medalists for Canada
Perth Heat players
Rochester Red Wings players
Sioux City Explorers players
Sugar Land Skeeters players
World Baseball Classic players of Canada
2013 World Baseball Classic players
2017 World Baseball Classic players
2019 WBSC Premier12 players
Medalists at the 2015 Pan American Games
Medalists at the 2019 Pan American Games
Canadian expatriate baseball players in Australia